The Saffell Funeral Home, located at 4th and Clay Streets in Shelbyville, Kentucky, was built in about 1830.  It was listed on the National Register of Historic Places in 1984.

It is or was a two-story, three bay brick side passage plan building which had been stuccoed by 1983.

It was listed as part of a larger study of historic resources in Shelbyville.

The building appears to have been removed by 2014.

References

National Register of Historic Places in Shelby County, Kentucky
Federal architecture in Kentucky
Commercial buildings completed in 1830
Commercial buildings on the National Register of Historic Places in Kentucky
Side passage plan architecture in the United States
Demolished but still listed on the National Register of Historic Places
Death care companies of the United States
Buildings and structures in Shelbyville, Kentucky